Borovnice is a municipality and village in Trutnov District in the Hradec Králové Region of the Czech Republic. It has about 400 inhabitants.

References

Villages in Trutnov District